Alison Valda Webster was the official Page 3 photographer for The Sun newspaper. She has worked in the British national newspaper industry for 30 years. Following the retirement of longtime principal Page 3 photographer Beverley Goodway in 2003, Webster took over the role in 2005. Her work on Page 3 came to an end when The Sun discontinued the Page 3 print edition in January 2015 and closed down the Page3.com website in 2017.

Controversy 
The No More Page 3 campaign launched in 2012 with the goal of ending the tradition of publishing topless models in The Sun. When asked about the campaign, Webster said that, "people should be able to make their own choices." She also commented: "The photographs have stayed the same for 40 years. They've not got any more explicit. It staggers me that some, particularly young people, still have an issue with them. ... The argument is the wrong way round. If you have a problem with your body, if, as a child, you grew up with certain body issues, then I can see how Page Three could affect you. But if you are comfortable with yourself then it will have no effect on you at all."

Private life 
Webster is married to the deputy editor of The Sun, Geoff Webster, who was cleared in March 2015, along with colleagues, of making illegal payments to public officials after a trial at the Old Bailey. The journalists had been charged as part of Operation Elveden.

Webster nearly died as a result of blood clots causing pulmonary hypertension, but was operated on in 2011.

See also 

 Glamour photography
 Glamour modelling
 The Sun newspaper
 Operation Elveden

References

External links 
 

British erotic photographers
Year of birth missing (living people)
Living people
The Sun (United Kingdom) people
British women photographers